Tarfaya Wind Farm is a wind farm  in Morocco, located in 20 km from Tarfaya. It was developed by Tarec (Trarfaya Energy Company), a 50/50 joint venture of Nareva Holding and International Power Ltd. Tarfaya Wind Farm is owned and operated by  a 50:50 joint venture between the GDF SUEZ and Nareva Holding and it is Africa's 2nd largest capacity wind farm after Lake Turkana Wind Project, with 131 wind turbines, each generating 2.5 Megawatts of power, and a total installed capacity of 301 MW. It was on the list of ten “Most Outstanding African Projects in 2015”, a ranking by Jeune Afrique magazine.
The park was commissioned in December 2014 after two years of work and investment of 5 billion dirhams. Its constructor and operator is Tarec, which sells the power generated to the National Electricity Office.

See also 

 List of wind farms in Morocco

References 

Energy infrastructure completed in 2014
Wind farms in Morocco
2014 establishments in Morocco
21st-century architecture in Morocco